The Archdeacon of Dublin is a senior ecclesiastical officer within the Anglican Diocese of Dublin and Glendalough. The Archdeacon is responsible for the disciplinary supervision of the clergy within the Dublin part of the diocese, which is by far the largest.

The archdeaconry can trace its history back to Torquil who held the office in 1180. The current incumbent is David Pierpoint. In between, many of them went on to higher office:
Geoffrey de Turville
Nicholas  de  Clere 
Nicholas Hill
Robert Dyke
Thomas  Bache
 Henry Ussher
 Launcelot Bulkeley
 Richard Reader
 Enoch Reader
 Richard Pococke
 Robert Fowler
 James Saurin
 John Winthrop Crozier
 Samuel Greenfield Poyntz
 Noel Vincent Willoughby
 Robert Warke
 Gordon Linney

References

 
Lists of Anglican archdeacons in Ireland
Diocese of Dublin and Glendalough